The Miller Building was a historic building located in the central part of Davenport, Iowa, United States. It was listed on the National Register of Historic Places in 1983.

History
Dr. William Miller built this structure around 1885. He used the first floor for his medical practice and lived in the residential space on the second floor. Other commercial interests also occupied the building over the years. The building was a part of a larger commercial strip on Harrison Street that was torn down in 1985 and subsequently replaced by a modern facility housing a daycare center.

Architecture
The Miller Building was a two-story brick building. The Late Victorian style structure exemplified the variety of brickwork that was found in Davenport's commercial architecture. It featured a three-bay façade, cast iron shop front, keystone depressed round-arch windows, and a corbelled cornice. An addition had been built onto the back.

References

Victorian architecture in Iowa
Former buildings and structures in Davenport, Iowa
Commercial buildings on the National Register of Historic Places in Iowa
National Register of Historic Places in Davenport, Iowa
Demolished buildings and structures in Iowa